HOT Comedy Central is the Hebrew-language version Comedy Central. It is the 10th Comedy Central channel. The channel was launched on January 1, 2011. The channel shows international and local shows. The channel is owned by Ananey Communications under license from Paramount Networks UK & Australia and broadcasts exclusively for cable on HOT.

The channel was initially broadcast in 4:3 aspect ratio, later transferred to 16:9 widescreen yet still in standard definition, and began broadcasting in High Definition on August 3, 2015.

Shows

International
 Brooklyn Nine-Nine
 30 Rock
 Broad City
 Inside Amy Schumer
 Big Time in Hollywood, FL
 I Live with Models
 Beavis and Butt-head (season 8)
 Anger Management
 Community
 punk'd
 Crank Yankers
 Workaholics
 Comedy Central Roast
 Important Things with Demetri Martin
 Reno 911!
 Blue Mountain State
 2 Broke Girls
 South Park
 The Colbert Report
 That 70s Show
 Scrubs
 Mike & Molly
 Tosh.0
 Chappelle's Show
 Premium Blend
 Comedy Central Presents
 The Daily Show (Global Edition, 2011–2015)
 Conan (season 1)
 Friends
 The Drew Carey Show
 The Sarah Silverman Program
 Fist of Zen
 Samantha Who?
 Happy Endings
 Whitney
 The Office (U.S. TV series)
 Everybody Loves Raymond

Original \ Local
 The Wedding Season
 Comeback
 The Green Project
 Red Band
 The University
 Outlawed
 Singles
 Hayot Layla
 Life Of Avi The Singer

See also
 Comedy Central
 MTV Israel
 Ananey Communications
 Nickelodeon Israel
 Bip

References

External links
 Comedy Central Israel Official Website
 South Park Studios Israeli site

Comedy Central
Television channels in Israel
Television channels and stations established in 2011
Hot (Israel)